Down the Road is the second and last studio album by Stephen Stills' band Manassas. It was released in April 1973, and peaked at number 26 in the US charts, to mixed reviews.  "Isn't It About Time", a protest song, was released as the lead single and reached number 56 on the charts.

Background 
After a very critically and commercially successful year, 1972, things changed when they regrouped to record at Criteria Studios in early 1973. Stills had met and married French pop singer Veronique Sanson, while Hillman re-united with the rest of the Byrds for a one-shot reunion album. Hillman was also entertaining a big-money offer from David Geffen's Asylum Records to form a new super-group with J.D. Souther and Richie Furay. Arguments and increased drug-use were extremely prevalent, and Stills was losing money paying for each member each night. Before and during the recording of this album Stills maintained a round the clock schedule with Manassas in the studio, which resulted in another album of unreleased material written by Stills, Chris Hillman, Dallas Taylor, and Fuzzy Samuels, that included Stevie Wonder singing on a track.

Recording 
The album was initially recorded at Criteria Studios, Miami with the Albert Brothers, until an increasingly combative Stills caused the brothers to quit halfway during recording, so sessions moved to Caribou Ranch, Colorado and to Los Angeles. To make matters worse Atlantic Records, then rejected some of the tracks, which necessitated re-recordings, resulting in patchwork quality to the album. Some suspect that the album was rejected for containing too few Stills' songs and too many from Chris Hillman. "Down the Road" and "So Many Times" were recorded in September 1972 at Criteria, Miami. The rest of the tracks were recorded in January 1973.

Aftermath 
After the dysfunctional recording sessions and some initial touring dates, the band started to fall apart with Stills (along with Joe Lala), joining Crosby, Nash and Young in Hawaii for an (ill-fated) reunion, and Hillman (along with Perkins and Harris) joining the Souther-Hillman-Furay Band. By the time Stills continued on with Manassas, Dallas Taylor was dealing with crippling heroin addiction. Stills paid for him to go to rehab, then found him shooting up in a bathroom, which ended Taylor's stint in the band. Calvin "Fuzzy" Samuel left for personal reasons around the same time and was replaced by Kenny Passarelli. The subsequent set of touring dates were the band's last, ending in October, with Stills reuniting with Crosby, Nash & Young for a tour the following year.

Stills supported the album with two tours and a performance on ABC's In Concert series on the 16th April 1973 at Bananafish Gardens, New York, which was maligned upon showing; one video of the band performing "Do You Remember the Americans" has appeared, but nothing else since.

Reception 
The album was not very well received. Rolling Stone was especially critical, saying "[i]t would be sad to think the people involved put this record out not because of business pressures but because they were proud of it."  Richard Williams for Melody Maker 1973, said ' For me, the two Latin songs are the best; Stills has a real affinity for this music - the hoarse strained quality of his voice suits the yearning mood of the tunes - and I'd love to see 'Pensamiento' become a hit single'.

It made it only to No. 26 on the Billboard album charts and its single, "Isn't It About Time", made it only to No. 56 on the Billboard singles charts.  By 1974, the album had sold an estimated 300,000 copies in the US.

Stills blamed the failure of the album on Atlantic preferring to have a CSNY reunion, which was a guaranteed cash cow. Other reasons for the commercial decline include record stores not knowing which section to put the album in: either under Stills' name or under Manassas'. Billboard, Record World and Cash Box, all credited the album to Manassas rather than Stephen Stills' Manassas like they credited the debut record; Meaning, many people might have been unaware that this was a new Stephen Stills album.

Track listing

Personnel
Manassas
 Stephen Stills - guitar, piano, bass, vocals
Dallas Taylor - drums
Chris Hillman - guitar, bass, mandolin, vocals
Joe Lala - percussion, vocals
Al Perkins - guitar, pedal steel guitar, banjo
Calvin "Fuzzy" Samuel - bass, vocals
Paul Harris - piano
Guests
Joe Walsh - slide guitar
Bobby Whitlock - keyboards
 Sydney George - flute
 Jerry Aiello - organ
 Charlie Grimes - guitar
 Guille Garcia - percussion
 Lachy Espinol - percussion
Pat Arnold - vocals
Technical Personnel
 Stephen Stills, Chris Hillman, Dallas Taylor - production
 The Albert Brothers - engineers at Criteria Studios, Miami, Florida
 Jeff Guerico - engineer at Caribou Ranch, Nederland, Colorado
 Bill Halverson, Malcolm Cecil - engineers at Record Plant, Los Angeles, California
 The Albert Brothers, Bill Halverson, Stephen Stills -  mixdown engineers  
 Bob Jenkins - photography
 Bob Jenkins, Buddy Zoloth - design

Thanks again to Michael John Bowen and his Manassas road crew

Charts 

Album

Singles

Tour 
The Stephen Stills Manassas North American Tour 1973 was a concert tour by American musician Stephen Stills and his band Manassas. It was in support of their 1973 album Down the Road. Manassas released the album Down the Road in April 1973, it was less well received than their debut, with many of the recording sessions for it being disjointed. This resulted in the cancellation of a few dates of the first leg of the tour. The first show back was recorded for the ABC in Concert TV series, during which Stills remarked that he hadn't played with the band since before Christmas. Unsurprisingly this show wasn't very well received. CSNY reunited to record an aborted album in June–July 1973 further complicating the tour. However CSN and CSNY reunited at the October Winterland Arena shows which planted the seeds for the CSNY 1974 reunion tour. It was during this second leg of the tour that John Barbata filled in for Dallas Taylor on the drums for one show due to his drug addiction and Kenny Passarelli filled in for George "Chocolate" Perry on bass due to prior commitments.

Manassas

 Stephen Stills - guitar, piano, bass, vocals
 Dallas Taylor - drums
 Chris Hillman - guitar, bass, mandolin, vocals
 Joe Lala - percussion, vocals
 Al Perkins – guitar, pedal steel guitar, banjo
 Calvin "Fuzzy" Samuel – bass, vocals
 Paul Harris – piano

Setlist

Typical tour Setlist

All songs written by Stephen Stills, except where noted.

Electric set I

 "Song of Love"
 "Rock and Roll Crazies"/ "Cuban Bluegrass" (Stills/ Dallas Taylor, Stills/Joe Lala)
 "Jet Set (Sigh)"
 "Anyway"
 "So You Want to Be a Rock 'n' Roll Star" (Roger McGuinn, Chris Hillman)
 "Johnny's Garden"
 "Go Back Home"

Acoustic set

 "Six Days on the Road" (Dave Dudley)
 "Safe at Home" (Chris Hillman)
 "Fallen Eagle"
 "Hide It So Deep"
 "You're Still on My Mind" (Luke McDaniel)

Electric set II

 "Pensamiento"
 "49 Bye-Byes"/"For What It's Worth"
 "Lies" (Chris Hillman)
 "The Treasure"
 "Carry On"
 "Find the Cost of Freedom"

References 

1973 albums
Manassas (band) albums
Atlantic Records albums